Marávia District is a district of Tete Province in western Mozambique. Its administrative center is the town of Fingoé. The district is located in the northwest of the province, and borders with Zambia in the north, Chifunde District in the east, Chiuta District in the southeast, Cahora-Bassa District in the south, Magoé District in the southwest, and with Zumbo District in the west. It has a population of 82,789 as of 2007.

Geography
The Zambezi makes the border of the district with Magoé and Cahora-Bassa Districts. All major rivers in the district belong to the drainage basin of the Zambezi. They include the Capoche River, the Unkanha River, the Luatize River, the Duanga River, and the Mucumbudzi River.

Demographics
As of 2005, 50% of the population of the district was younger than 15 years. 9% of the population spoke Portuguese. The most common mothertongue among the population was Cinyungwe. 88% were analphabetic, mostly women.

Administrative divisions
The district is divided into four postos, Chiputo (three localities), Fingoé (three localities), Molowera (three localities), and Chipera (four localities).

Economy
Less than 1% of the households in the district have access to electricity.

Agriculture
In the district, there are 13,000 farms which have on average  of land. The main agricultural products are corn, cassava, cowpea, peanut, and sweet potato.

Transportation

References

Districts in Tete Province